Browns Mill may refer to:

Browns Mill, Ohio
Browns Mill, Virginia
Browns Mill, West Virginia

See also
Browns Mills, New Jersey